

Buxton Museum and Art Gallery focuses its collection on history, geology and archaeology primarily from the Peak District and Derbyshire.

The museum is located at Terrace Road, Buxton, England.  The museum opens Tuesday to Saturday all year round and from Easter to the end of September is also open on Sunday and Bank Holiday afternoons. Admission is free. The building was erected in 1880 and originally served as the Peak Hydropathic Hotel. During the First World War, the Red Cross used it to care for wounded Canadian soldiers. The Buxton Free Public Library & Museum moved into the building in 1928, leaving the Town Hall.

Permanent collections
The museum's permanent collections include:

 Carboniferous limestone fossil record of the Peak District collected between 1900 and 1950;
 Pliocene mammal evidence from caves and quarries throughout the Peak District;
 The archives of archaeologist Sir William Boyd Dawkins and geologist Dr John Wilfrid (J.W.) Jackson, geologists associated with the county and with Manchester Museum;
Randolph Douglas 'House of Wonders' collection from Castleton which includes a large collection of locks and keys and some unusual Houdini material;
 A Buxton photographic collection, a collection of  local social history and ephemera, and a collection of Houdini materials;
 A fine art collection dominated by 19th and 20th century works in watercolours, oils and prints, including works by Sir Frank Brangwyn, Marc Chagall and Edgar Chahine.

Amongst the minerals are Blue John, carved limestone, local specimens, and cave deposits. In 2006, Buxton Museum purchased a rare collection of decorative Ashford Black Marble wares, together with tools used to work the stone collection left by John Michael Tomlinson.  Other collections relating to Derbyshire also managed from Buxton Museum and Art Gallery include a Derbyshire Police Collection.

The museum's permanent galleries include the recreated Boyd Dawkins Study and the 'Wonders of the Peak' gallery. Dawkins bequeathed to the museum a complete Victorian study containing his furniture, scientific instruments, books, Oriental ware and fossil collection. The 'Wonders of the Peak' gallery was redesigned and relaunched in September 2017. It explores Peak District history from the Lower Carboniferous to the present day. There are also two temporary exhibition galleries displaying a changing programme of work by visiting artists or drawn from the museum's own collections.

A museum project has repatriated Native American and First Nation artefacts. Items were returned to Haida Gwaii and the Siksika Nation peoples.

See also 
 List of museums in Derbyshire

References

External links
 Museum website
Wonders of the Peak web app
Images from the collection

Art museums and galleries in Derbyshire
Local museums in Derbyshire
Museums in Derbyshire
Tourist attractions of the Peak District
Archaeological museums in England
Geology museums in England
Natural history museums in England
Buildings and structures in Buxton